Phil Captain 3D McNally is a Northern Irish-born British/American animator best known for his work in 3-D film; in the 1990s, he legally changed his middle name to "Captain 3D". The BBC describes him as a "leading pioneer of 3D animation.". McNally is considered to be one of the world's leading stereographers. He is world renowned for his expertise in VR/AR/MR.

A graduate of the Royal College of Art in London, McNally's first public presentation of his work was at SIGGRAPH 2000. He subsequently moved to America, where he joined Industrial Light and Magic; as an animator. While at Industrial Light & Magic he supervised the 3D conversion of Chicken Little before moving to Disney Animation as the supervising Stereographer. He was then hired by Jeffrey Katzenberg at DreamWorks Animation, where he was given the task of developing and building the DreamWorks Animation 3D pipeline. He left DreamWorks Animation to become the Global Stereographer at Rocket Science 3D.

References

External links
Official site
Official site
https://variety.com/2011/film/features/katzenberg-still-has-tremendous-enthusiasm-for-3d-1118043195/
https://horrorcultfilms.co.uk/?s=Phil+McNally+captain+3D
https://www.definitionmagazine.com/journal/2011/1/10/dreamworks-animation-lead-stereographer-is-keynote-for-advan.html
http://images.autodesk.com/adsk/files/dreamworks_monstersvsaliens_maya_lustre.pdf
http://www.postmagazine.com/Publications/Post-Magazine/2010/May-1-2010/MOVING-IN-3D-STEREO.aspx
 https://www.fastcompany.com/1699988/dreamworks-phil-captain-3d-mcnally-megamind-james-cameron-third-dimension-fad

Living people
Year of birth missing (living people)
British animators
British animated film directors
People from Dundonald, County Down
3D cinema